157th meridian may refer to:

157th  meridian east, a line of longitude east of the Greenwich Meridian
157th meridian west, a line of longitude west of the Greenwich Meridian